Cottonwood Creek, is a stream in Kern County, California.  Its headwaters are located on the eastern slopes of the Tehachapi Mountains, near a spring 2 miles northwest of the Libre Twins peak.  It flows east then southeast into Antelope Valley in the western Mojave Desert.

History 
A Spanish and later Mexican road from Pueblo de Los Angeles crossed the Antelope Valley from Elizabeth Lake to Cottonwood Creek that then followed the creek up to the point where it crossed the Tehachapi Mountains at Puerto el Tejon (Tejon Pass), then following Tejon Creek down into the San Joaquin Valley.  Along and south of this creek Rancho El Tejon was established in 1843.  Later Gold Rush 49ers, later emigrants, and teamsters followed this route to the gold fields. In 1854, wagon traffic changed to the easier Grapevine route which became the Stockton - Los Angeles Road and the Old Tejon Pass route was gradually abandoned for the route through Fort Tejon Pass.

See also

Cottonwood Creek (Inyo County, California)
Cottonwood Creek (Sacramento River)

References

Cottonwood Creek(Kern County)
Tehachapi Mountains
Cottonwood Creek(Kern County)
History of Kern County, California
Pre-statehood history of California
History of Southern California
Rivers of Southern California